Frans Slaats (born Waalwijk, Netherlands, 11 June 1912, died Waalwijk, 6 April 1993) was a Dutch professional cyclist who broke the world hour record.

Slaats was a prominent velodrome rider in the 1930s, especially in Six-day racing. In September 1937 he set the world hour record at 45.558 km on the Vigorelli track in Milan, Italy. It was bettered the same year by the French rider, Maurice Archambaud.

Slaats was at the Buenos Aires six-day in Argentina when World War II  began in 1939. On returning to the Netherlands when  peace came in 1945, he found his four brothers had been killed by the Germans.

Palmarès

1934
 2nd Berlin six-day
1936
3rd Ronde van Valkenburg
1st Amsterdam six-day
2nd Ghent six-day
1st Copenhagen six-day
1937
1st Antwerp six-day
World hour record
1st Copenhagen six-day
1938
1st Ghent six-day
2nd Antwerp six-day
1939
1st Brussels six-day
3rd Copenhagen six-day
1944
1st Buenos Aires six-day

References

External links

1912 births
1993 deaths
Dutch male cyclists
Dutch track cyclists
People from Waalwijk
Cyclists from North Brabant
20th-century Dutch people